Vranov nad Topľou District is a district in the Prešov Region of eastern Slovakia. 
Until 1918, the district was mostly part of the county of Kingdom of Hungary of Zemplén, apart from an area around Hanušovce nad Topľou which formed part of the county of Sáros.

Municipalities

Babie
Banské
Benkovce
Bystré
Cabov
Čaklov
Čičava
Čierne nad Topľou
Davidov
Detrík
Dlhé Klčovo
Ďapalovce
Ďurďoš
Giglovce
Girovce
Hanušovce nad Topľou
Hencovce
Hermanovce nad Topľou
Hlinné
Holčíkovce
Jasenovce
Jastrabie nad Topľou
Juskova Voľa
Kamenná Poruba
Kladzany
Komárany
Kučín
Kvakovce
Majerovce
Malá Domaša
Matiaška
Medzianky
Merník
Michalok
Nižný Hrabovec
Nižný Hrušov
Nižný Kručov
Nová Kelča
Ondavské Matiašovce
Pavlovce
Petkovce
Petrovce
Piskorovce
Poša
Prosačov
Radvanovce
Rafajovce
Remeniny
Rudlov
Ruská Voľa
Sačurov
Sečovská Polianka
Sedliská
Skrabské
Slovenská Kajňa
Soľ
Štefanovce
Tovarné
Tovarnianska Polianka
Vavrinec
Vechec
Vlača
Vranov nad Topľou
Vyšný Kazimír
Vyšný Žipov
Zámutov
Zlatník
Žalobín

References 

Districts of Slovakia
Geography of Prešov Region